Alison Faith Levy is a San Francisco-based musician and songwriter, known as a pop and jazz performer on keyboards and vocals, most notably as a member of power pop group The Loud Family, as well as for her later work as a children's musician in The Sippy Cups and as a solo artist.

Musical career

Rock and jazz
In 1994, Levy released a solo EP, Grumbelina, followed by the 1995 single "The Scientist."

Scott Miller invited Levy in 1997 to become a member of the Loud Family, filling a vacancy left by Paul Wieneke's departure. Levy played keyboards and piano and provided backup vocals on the Loud Family's 1998 album Days for Days.<ref
name=strongdiscog></ref><ref
name=amgbook2002></ref> On the group's album Attractive Nuisance (2000), Levy also wrote and performed lead vocals on the song "The Apprentice."<ref
name=strongdiscog /> After Miller's death in 2013, she joined Miller's 1980s band Game Theory as lead vocalist for a reunion performance at a memorial tribute in Sacramento.

Describing Levy's contribution to the Loud Family, Miller stated, "To me she brought in that classic 1967 to '74 way of doing piano pop–rock that I’m all in favor of but can’t accomplish because I don’t play piano. She had the most sheer musicianly keyboard chops of anyone I’ve played with. And her vocals are pretty distinctive. More toward the soul end of things than other female singers I’ve had in the band. So that line-up had more of a Todd Rundgren, Cat Stevens, Rod Argent, Carole King approach."<ref
name=glono2003></ref>

In 1998, shortly after the release of the Loud Family's Days for Days, Levy also issued her full-length solo debut, The Fog Show. She released a second solo CD, My World View, in 2000.

In the late 1990s, Levy joined San Francisco psychedelic jazz collective Mushroom, and appears as keyboardist and vocalist on a number of their CDs.<ref
name=auralinnov1999></ref><ref
name=mushroomsite></ref>
Levy also performed with British folk rock tribute supergroup The Minstrel in the Galleries, featuring John Wesley Harding.

With Jad Fair's guitarist Chuck Marcus, Levy formed the experimental group Sonoptic, which released the album Chore Overload in 1999.

In 2008, with alternative rock musician Victor Krummenacher of Camper Van Beethoven, she formed the "Americana" rock band McCabe and Mrs. Miller. She has also performed in the Bay Area with the Brian Cline Band.

Children's music
Turning in the 2000s to children's music, Levy was a founding member of the Sippy Cups, with whom she released the CDs Kids Rock for Peas (2005), Electric Storyland (2006), and The Time Machine (2009), and the four-song mini CD Snail Song & Magic Toast (2005).

Levy's first solo CD of children's music, World of Wonder, produced by indie pop musician Allen Clapp of The Orange Peels, was released in 2012. She now performs with her band Big Time Tot Rock, which includes Clapp on guitar, drummer Andrew Griffin, ukulele player/backing vocalist Karla Kane and bassist Khoi Huynh.

The Start of Things (2015), her second solo children's CD, contains upbeat music with subtle themes of self-expression, self-empowerment and self-acceptance.

Theatre, film and video
Levy is married to the independent filmmaker Danny Plotnick, and scored a number of his films. Levy appeared in Plotnick's 2003 rock documentary Loud Family Live 2000 and his 1999 short film Swingers' Serenade, and she co-wrote and co-directed the short film I, Socky with him in 1998.

As of 2015, Levy and children's author Veronica Wolff were working with a musical theater company in San Francisco to adapt Levy's CD World of Wonder into a full-length stage musical for families.

Notes

External links 

 
 
 McCabe & Mrs. Miller collection on the Internet Archive's live music archive
 

Living people
American singer-songwriters
Year of birth missing (living people)